is a 1987 Japanese film directed by Shunichi Kajima.

Awards and nominations
9th Yokohama Film Festival 
 Won: Best Director - Shunichi Kajima
 Won: Best Supporting Actress - Eri Ishida
 5th Best Film

References

1987 films
Films directed by Shunichi Kajima
1980s Japanese-language films
1980s Japanese films